Paul Samson-Körner (13 November 1887 – 25 August 1942) was a German heavyweight boxer. After retiring he became a stage and film actor.

Selected filmography
 Annemarie and Her Cavalryman (1926)
 The Duty to Remain Silent (1928)
 Number 17 (1928)
 Dive (1929)
 Sin and Morality (1929)
 Love in the Ring (1930)
 Three Days of Love (1931)
 The Testament of Cornelius Gulden (1932)
 Knockout (1935)
 Ninety Minute Stopover (1936)
 The Three Codonas (1940)

References

Bibliography
 James K. Lyon. Brecht Unbound. University of Delaware Press, 1995.

External links

1887 births
1942 deaths
German male film actors
German male silent film actors
20th-century German male actors
German male stage actors
German male boxers
People from Zwickau